Pa Dar (also Romanized as Pā Dar and Pādar) is a village in Beyhaq Rural District, Sheshtomad District, Sabzevar County, Razavi Khorasan Province, Iran. At the 2006 census, its population was 175, in 72 families.

References 

Populated places in Sabzevar County